Orpheus Michael Roye (born January 21, 1973) is a former American football defensive end who played in the National Football League (NFL). He was drafted by the Pittsburgh Steelers in the sixth round of the 1996 NFL Draft. In 2009, he won Super Bowl XLIII with the Steelers, beating the Arizona Cardinals. He played college football at Florida State.

Roye also played for the Cleveland Browns.

College career
He first attended Jones County Junior College in Ellisville, MS, where he was named JC All-America, registering 76 tackles and 12 sacks.  He then transferred to Florida State University. He graduated from Miami Springs High School in Miami Springs, Florida.  He played for the legendary coach Buddy Goins at Miami Springs.

Professional career

First stint with Steelers
Roye was drafted by the Pittsburgh Steelers in the sixth round of the 1996 NFL Draft. He played for them from 1996 to 1999.

Cleveland Browns
Roye signed with the Cleveland Browns before the 2000 season. Orpheus was a mainstay for the Browns since 2000 with his reliable play and overall dependability. He underwent arthroscopic surgery on August 2, 2007. This is the same knee that caused his 2006 season to end early. He played for the Browns from 2000 to 2007.

Second stint with Steelers
On August 17, 2008, Roye was re-signed by the Steelers after being released by the Browns. Coach Mike Tomlin called Roye, "a veteran defensive lineman, a guy who knows how to play the game, a professional."  He became an unrestricted free agent at the end of the 2008 season.

References

External links
Pittsburgh Steelers bio

1973 births
Living people
Miami Springs Senior High School alumni
American football defensive ends
American football defensive tackles
Jones County Bobcats football players
Florida State Seminoles football players
Pittsburgh Steelers players
Cleveland Browns players
Players of American football from Miami